Jake Ilnicki (born 24 February 1992 in Williams Lake, British Columbia) is a Canadian rugby union prop who plays international rugby for Canada and professional club rugby for Old Glory DC in Major League Rugby (MLR). He has also played for the New South Wales Country Eagles in Australia's National Rugby Championship and for the Seattle Seawolves in MLR.

Ilnicki made his debut for Canada in 2013 and was part of the Canada squad at the 2015 Rugby World Cup.

In early 2016, Ilnicki was signed to the San Diego Breakers PRO Rugby team.

In December 2016, Ilnicki joined Aviva Premiership side Northampton Saints. The tight head prop made his first appearance in a Saints shirt during their Aviva 'A' League fixture against Leicester Tigers a few days after signing for the club.

Despite not making any first team appearances while with Saints, the Canadian prop helped Saints' second team the Northampton Wanderers reach the final of the Aviva 'A' League and eventually beat Gloucester United to lift the 2016/17 trophy.

In May 2017, it was announced that Ilnicki would leave Saints at the conclusion of the 2016/17 season. On 4 September 2017, Illnicki signed for English rivals Newcastle Falcons for the remainder of the 2017-18 season.

Near the end of the 2019 Major League Rugby season Ilnicki signed up with the Seattle Seawolves, playing in all their remaining matches that season including the 2019 Major League Rugby Final. He stayed with Seattle for two subsequent seasons before signing with Old Glory DC for the 2022 season.

Club statistics

References

External links

Living people
Canadian rugby union players
Canadian expatriate rugby union players
1992 births
Canada international rugby union players
Sportspeople from British Columbia
San Diego Breakers players
New South Wales Country Eagles players
Expatriate rugby union players in Australia
Expatriate rugby union players in New Zealand
Rugby union props
Manawatu rugby union players
Northampton Saints players
Newcastle Falcons players
Leeds Tykes players
Seattle Seawolves players
Old Glory DC players